Alexander Beyer (born 24 June 1973) is a German actor.

He was born in Erfurt, East Germany. He has appeared in such films as Volker Schloendorff's The Legend of Rita (Die Stille nach dem Schuss, 1999), Leander Haußmann's Sun Alley (Sonnenallee, 2000), Johannes Kiefer's Gregor's Greatest Invention (Gregors groesste Erfindung, 2001), which was nominated for an Academy Award for Live Action Short Film in 2002 and Wolfgang Becker's Good Bye Lenin! (2003), among others.

Beyer lives and works in Zurich, Switzerland, and Berlin, Germany.

Filmography 
2022: Dalíland directed by Mary Harron
2022: Operation Mincemeat directed by John Madden
2020: Persian Lessons directed by Vadim Perelman
2018:  The Little Drummer Girl directed by Park Chan-wook
2018:  Deutschland 86 directed by Florian Cossen
2018:  Styx directed by Wolfgang Fischer
2016:  Burg Schreckenstein directed by Ralf Huettner
2016:  Berlin Station directed by Michaël R. Roskam
2015:  3 Türken und ein Baby directed by Sinan Akkuş
2015:  Deutschland 83 directed by Edward Berger
2013:  The Fifth Estate directed by Bill Condon
2012:   directed by 
2010:  A Film Unfinished directed by Yael Hersonski
2010:  The Whore
2009:  
2008:  Miracle at St. Anna, directed by Spike Lee
2007:  War and Peace, as Count Pierre Bezukhov – Dir. Robert Dornhelm
2007:  Attack on Leningrad – Dir. Aleksandr Buravsky (starring Armin Mueller-Stahl, Mira Sorvino, Gabriel Byrne)
2006:  Mary on Water (original title: Maria am Wasser) – Dir. Thomas Wendrich (starring Annika Blendl and Hermann Beyer)
2005:   (original title: 3° kälter) – Dir. Florian Hoffmeister (starring Meret Becker and Bibiana Beglau)
2005:  Tatort – Nur ein Spiel – Dir. Manuel Siebenmann (starring)
2005:  Munich – Dir. Steven Spielberg (starring Eric Bana, Daniel Craig, Mathieu Kassovitz, Hanns Zischler, Geoffrey Rush)
2004:  Hierankl – Dir. Hans Steinbichler (starring Barbara Sukowa, Johanna Wokalek, Josef Bierbichler)
2003:  Good Bye Lenin! – Dir. Wolfgang Becker (starring Katrin Sass, Daniel Brühl, Chulpan Khamatova)
2003:  Eierdiebe – Dir. Robert Schwentke (starring Julia Hummer, Wotan Wilke Möhring)
2003:  Hamlet_X – Dir. Herbert Fritsch (starring Christoph Schlingensief, Meret Becker und Milan Peschel)
2002:  Half the Rent (original title: Halbe Miete) – Dir. Marc Ottiker
2002:  Sophiiiie! – Dir. Michael Hofmann (starring Katharina Schüttler)
2002:  Tatort – Schlaraffenland – Dir. Nina Grosse (starring Eva Mattes, Michael Gwisdek)
2001:  Gregor's Greatest Invention – Dir. Johannes Kiefer (Academy Award Oscar Nominee 2002, starring Helga Göring, Doris Egbring-Kahn and Christel Peters)
2001:  Heinrich der Säger – Dir. Klaus Gietinger (starring Rolf Becker, Meret Becker and Karina Krawczyk)
2001:  Die Hunde sind schuld – Dir. Andreas Prochaska (starring Barbara Valentin)
2001:  Das Monstrum – Dir. Miriam Pfeiffer (starring Corinna Harfouch)
2000:  The Legend of Rita (original title: Die Stille nach dem Schuss) – Dir. Volker Schlöndorff (starring Bibiana Beglau, Martin Wuttke and Nadja Uhl)
2000:  Liebesau – Die andere Heimat – Dir. Wolfgang Panzer (starring Katharina Thalbach, Anna Thalbach)
1999:  Sonnenallee – Dir. Leander Haußmann (starring Alexander Scheer, Katharina Thalbach, Robert Stadlober, Detlev Buck)
1999:  To the Horizon and Beyond (original title: Bis zum Horizont und weiter) – Dir. Peter Kahane (starring Corinna Harfouch)
1998:  The Big Mambo (original title: Das Mambospiel) – Dir. Michael Gwisdek (starring Jürgen Vogel und Corinna Harfouch)
1997:  Der Hauptmann von Köpenick – Dir. Frank Beyer (starring Harald Juhnke, Rolf Hoppe, Udo Samel, Sophie Rois)

External links

Players Agentur Management GmbH
German Cinema 
Official site

1973 births
Living people
Actors from Erfurt
Male actors from Berlin
German male film actors
German male television actors
21st-century German male actors